Aneta Łabuda (born 7 January 1995) is a Polish handball player for ESBF Besançon and the Polish national team.

She competed at the 2015 World Women's Handball Championship in Denmark.

References

External links

1995 births
Living people
Polish female handball players
People from Żary
Expatriate handball players
Polish expatriate sportspeople in France
21st-century Polish women